Hunterian may refer to many things named after William Hunter (1718–1783):

Hunterian Collection
Hunterian Museum and Art Gallery
Hunterian Psalter

The following are named after his brother, John Hunter (1728–1793):

Hunterian Society
Hunterian Museum at the Royal College of Surgeons of England
Hunterian Oration

Other uses include:
Hunterian transliteration (named after William Wilson Hunter)